Brian Laumatia is a former professional rugby league footballer who played for the Cronulla Sharks in the Super League in Australia.

Playing career
In 1994 he played for the Counties Manukau Heroes in the Lion Red Cup, and represented Auckland.

Laumatia was a Samoan international and played at the 1992 Pacific Cup, and the 1995 World Cup.

Later years
Since retiring he has joined the New Zealand Police, and currently is the Captain-Coach of the Counties-Manukau Police rugby league team.

References

External links
World Cup 1995 details
NRL’s island talent
Statistics at rugbyleagueproject.org

Year of birth missing (living people)
Living people
New Zealand rugby league players
New Zealand sportspeople of Samoan descent
Samoa national rugby league team players
Counties Manukau rugby league team players
Mangere East Hawks players
Cronulla-Sutherland Sharks players
New Zealand police officers
Auckland rugby league team players
Junior Kiwis players
Rugby league wingers